Samuel Achilefu is a Nigerian-born scientist and medical researcher who has pioneered both fundamental and applied research in science, engineering, and medicine. Dr. Samuel Achilefu is the Michel M. Ter-Pogossian Professor of Radiology and Vice Chair for Innovation and Entrepreneurship at the Mallinckrodt Institute of Radiology, Washington University School of Medicine. He holds joint appointments as a professor of medicine, biochemistry and molecular biophysics, and biomedical engineering. He currently serves as the Director of the Washington University Molecular Imaging Center and the privately funded Theranostic Innovation Program. He is co-director of the Center for Multiple Myeloma Nanotherapy and co-Leader of the Oncologic Imaging Program of the Alvin J. Siteman Cancer Center at Washington University.

Achilefu is a fellow of the National Academy of Inventors as well as many professional societies, including the Royal Society of Chemistry,  American Association for the Advancement of Science, the Optical Society of America, the International Society for Optics and Photonics Engineers (SPIE), the American Institute for Medical and Biological Engineering, and the St. Louis Academy of Science. A member of the National Advisory Council for Biomedical Imaging and Bioengineering (NACBIB) and the Scientific Advisory Board of the National Cancer Institute’s intramural Molecular Imaging Program, he also serves as Editor-in-Chief of Current Analytical Chemistry and an editorial board member of many scientific publications. Dr. Achilefu is a former trustee of Loma Linda University in California. He was a member of the College of Reviewers for the National Institutes of Health (NIH) and served as a member and chair of grant review panels for the NIH, the Department of Defense (DoD), and the Susan G. Komen Foundation.

Education
Achilefu earned his PhD from the University of Nancy in France as a French Government Scholar and his postdoctoral training at Oxford University in England.

He was recruited from Oxford to St. Louis to work for Mallinckrodt Medical in 1993 and joined the Mallinckrodt Institute of Radiology at Washington University in 2001, where he established the more than 80-member Optical Radiology program at the School of Medicine.

Research
Achilefu is an expert in the development and use of light-sensitive drugs for cancer detection, imaging, and therapy. Recently, he conceived and led the development of a novel wearable cancer viewing goggles for the accurate removal of cancer cells during surgery. The cancer goggle works on the principle of optical imaging.  Optical imaging enables real-time visualization of intrinsic and exogenous contrast within biological tissues. Cancer goggles are designed to make it easier for surgeons to distinguish malignant cells from healthy cells, helping to ensure that no stray tumor cells are left behind during surgery to remove a cancerous tumor. He also discovered a novel treatment paradigm for cancer using a special type of light and non-pharmacological doses of drugs to selectively trigger cancer cell death without harming healthy tissue. These and many other innovations have resulted in 59 issued US patents  and over 300 scientific papers.

Achilefu has received over 30 local, national, and international honors and awards, including the Britton Chance Biomedical Optics Award in 2019 at SPIE, Distinguished Investigator Award in 2018 (Academy for Radiology & Biomedical Imaging Research), the Carl and Gerty Cori Faculty Achievement Award in 2018 (Washington University), Excellence in Healthcare Award in 2017 (St. Louis American),  the first Department of Defense Distinguished Investigator Award in 2016 (DoD Breast Cancer Research Program), IEEE Donald G. Fink Award (2016), Outstanding Scientist Award in 2015 (St. Louis Academy of Science), Best Global Impact 2015 (Alive magazine), St. Louis Innovator Award 2015, the Medical Innovation Award in 2014 (St. Louis Business Journal), St. Louis Award in 2014 (St. Louis Award Committee), Featured Innovator 2014 (Bloomberg BusinessWeek), Achiever Award 2008 (Blacks in Science), Extraordinary Performance Award 1998 (Mallinckrodt, Inc.), and Technical Innovation Award 1995 (Mallinckrodt Medical, Inc.).

Achilefu is featured in many public media. Representative examples include:

 Physics Worlds – Optics and Photonics Spotlight 
 SPIE announces 2019 Society Awards
 Scientists Report Advances in Light-source Medicine to Help Fight Metastatic Cancer
 National Public Radio; Story Collider: When science complicates home and family
 2018 AAAS Fellows approved by the AAAS Council
 Tumor imaging technique has potential as anti-cancer weapon, mouse study shows
 Glasses that make cancer glow
 New high-tech glasses detect cancer cells during surgery
 Goggles help surgeons ‘see’ tumours
 Special glasses help surgeons ‘see’ cancer
 Who To Watch: Samuel Achilefu, PhD
 New ‘Cancer Goggles’ help surgeons spot malignant tumors
 Hi-tech goggles 'detect cancer cells”
 Cancer-Spotting Goggles Help Surgeons Remove Diseased Cells
 Medical Innovator Award: Sam Achilefu, Washington University School of Medicine
 Inventor of 'Cancer Goggles' Receives St. Louis Award
 Academy of Science-St. Louis honors Washington University researchers
 Achilefu receives prestigious St. Louis Award

Honors and awards 

References

Bibliography 

 Samuel Achilefu Google Scholar Profile: https://scholar.google.com/citations?hl=en&user=YywM5OwAAAAJ&view_op=list_works&sortby=pubdate

Samuel Achilefu, director of Optical Radiology Laboratory: https://opticalradiologylab.wustl.edu/people/samuel-achilefu-phd/
Samuel Achilefu Facebook page: https://www.facebook.com/samuel.achilefu
Samuel Achilefu Twitter page: https://twitter.com/samuelachilefu?lang=en

Nigerian scientists
Nancy-Université alumni
Nigerian expatriates in the United States
Washington University in St. Louis faculty
Nigerian inventors
Members of the National Academy of Medicine